Roberto Longo may refer to:
 Roberto Longo (cyclist) (born 1984), Italian cyclist
 Roberto Longo (mathematician) (born 1953), Italian mathematician